Hololena curta, commonly known as corner funnel weaver or funnel web spider is a species of venomous spiders  belonging to a family of Agelenidae.

It is native to North America, including Canada and the United States.

This, and related species produce a venom that contains a group of insecticidal acylpolyamines, insecticidal peptide, and a group of neurotoxins.

References

External links
Taxonomy at UniProt
Taxonomy at ZipcodeZoo
Animal Diversity Web
Comparative Toxicogenomics Database

Agelenidae
Spiders of the United States
Spiders of Canada
Spiders described in 1894